The 4732nd Air Defense Group is a discontinued United States Air Force organization.  Its last assignment was with the 64th Air Division of Air Defense Command at Goose Air Force Base, Newfoundland, Canada, where it was discontinued in 1960.  The group was formed in 1957 when ADC assumed responsibility for air defense of Newfoundland and Northern Canada from Northeast Air Command and controlled a fighter-interceptor squadron at Harmon and seven squadrons operating radars at dispersed locations.  It was discontinued when Goose Air Defense Sector assumed responsibility for air defense of Newfoundland and Northern Canada.

History
The group was formed in 1957 when Air Defense Command (ADC) assumed responsibility for air defense of Newfoundland from Northeast Air Command (NEAC). It was a tenant organization at Goose AFB, a Strategic Air Command base, whose 4082nd Air Base Group (later 4082nd Combat Support Group) assumed host base duties from NEAC. it controlled both radar and fighter squadrons in Canada.  It was assigned the 59th Fighter-Interceptor Squadron (FIS), flying Northrop F-89 Scorpion aircraft, and the 4739th Radar Evaluation Flight, which were already stationed at Goose, and seven remote Aircraft Control & Warning Squadrons as operational elements, all of which were transferred from NEAC. The group provided air defense of northeast North America.  The 4732d was discontinued in 1960 and its subordinate units were assigned to the Goose Air Defense Sector.

Lineage
 Designated and organized as 4732nd Air Defense Group on 1 April 1957
 Discontinued on 1 April 1960

Assignments
 64th Air Division, 1 April 1957 – 1 April 1960

Components

 59th Fighter-Interceptor Squadron, 1 April 1957 – 1 April 1960
 4739th Radar Evaluation Flight (Electronic Countermeasures), 1 April 1957 – early 1958
 641st Aircraft Control and Warning Squadron
 Melville AS, Labrador, 1 April 1957 – 1 April 1960
 920th Aircraft Control and Warning Squadron
 Resolution Island AS, Northern Territories, 1 May 1958 – 1 April 1960
 921st Aircraft Control and Warning Squadron
 Saint Anthony AS, Labrador, 1 April 1957 – 1 April 1960

 922d Aircraft Control and Warning Squadron
 Cartwright AS, Labrador, 1 April 1957 – 1 April 1960
 923d Aircraft Control and Warning Squadron
 Hopedale AS, Labrador, 1 April 1957 – 1 April 1960
 924th Aircraft Control and Warning Squadron
 Saglek AS, Labrador, 1 April 1957 – 1 April 1960
 926th Aircraft Control and Warning Squadron
 Frobisher Bay AB, Northern Territories, 1 May 1958 – 1 April 1960

Stations
 Goose AFB, Newfoundland, Canada, 1 April 1957 – 1 April 1960

Aircraft
 F-89J 1957–1960

See also
 List of United States Air Force Aerospace Defense Command Interceptor Squadrons
 List of United States Air Force aircraft control and warning squadrons
 United States general surveillance radar stations

References

Notes

Bibliography

External links

Four digit groups of the United States Air Force
Air defense groups of the United States Air Force
Aerospace Defense Command units
Military units and formations established in 1957